Symphoricarpos microphyllus, the pink snowberry, is a North American species of flowering plant in the honeysuckle family. It is widespread across much of Mexico from Chihuahua to Chiapas, and found also in Guatemala, Honduras, and the US State of New Mexico.

Symphoricarpos microphyllusis an erect branching shrub sometimes as much as 3 meters (10 feet) tall, making it the tallest species in the genus. Leaves are up to 25 mm (1 inch) long, dark green on the upper surface but lighter green underneath. It has pink, bell-shaped flowers and white or pale pink fruits.

References

External links
photo of herbarium specimen collected in Coahuila in 1981

microphyllus
Flora of New Mexico
Plants described in 1819
Flora of Mexico
Flora of Honduras
Flora of Guatemala
Taxa named by Aimé Bonpland
Taxa named by Alexander von Humboldt